Horncliffe is a village in the county of Northumberland, England.

Governance 
Horncliffe is in the parliamentary constituency of Berwick-upon-Tweed.

Transport 
Borders Buses route 67 provides a number of services a day each way to/from Berwick-upon-Tweed railway station.

References

External links

 Horncliffe Memorial Hall - Main Street, Horncliffe, Northumberland. TD15 2XW

Villages in Northumberland